Dil Zaar Zaar (Urdu:دل زار زار) is a 2022 Pakistani family social television series, produced by Abdullah Kadwani and Asad Qureshi under their production banner 7th Sky Entertainment. It features Hina Altaf, Sami Khan, Azfar Rehman, Yasir Nawaz in lead roles.

Cast
Hina Altaf as Tayyaba Ismail
Sami Khan as Shobi
Azfar Rehman as Rayyan
Yasir Nawaz as Raees
Maria Wasti as Atiqa
Sunita Marshall as Shahpara
Asma Abbas as Khair-un-nisa
Rubina Ashraf as Miss Tani
Shabbir Jan as Ismail
Rashid Farooqui as Tahir
Sidra Niazi as Labiba
Namrah Shahid as Rutba
Kamran Jilani as Naveed
Shaista Jabeen as Sabeeha Ismail
Birjees Farooqui as Fazeelat
Ikram Abbasi as Asad
Fareeda Shabbir as Khalida
Syeda Aroona as Rafia
Kehkashan Faisal
Syed Hamza
Uzair Abbasi
Saba Khan
Shehzadi Mukhtar
Nazia Khan
Faisal Bali
Shahida Murtaza as Dr.Aneeqa Bilal

Guest Appearance
Saife Hassan as Mansoor

References

External Links

2022 Pakistani television series debuts
2022 Pakistani television series endings